Hamilton Airport may refer to 

 Hamilton Airport (New Zealand)
 Hamilton Airport (Victoria), Australia
 Hamilton Municipal Airport (New York), United States
 Hamilton Municipal Airport (Texas), United States
 Butler County Regional Airport, Ohio, United States
 John C. Munro Hamilton International Airport, Canada
 L.F. Wade International Airport, 6 nautical miles off Hamilton, Bermuda